Trusovo is a rural locality (a settlement) in Starokucherganovsky Selsoviet, Narimanovsky District, Astrakhan Oblast, Russia. The population was 1,610 as of 2010. There are 15 streets.

Geography 
Trusovo is located 44 km south of Narimanov (the district's administrative centre) by road. Bishtyubinka is the nearest rural locality.

References 

Rural localities in Narimanovsky District